Masonic Temple is a  summit located in the Grand Canyon, in Coconino County of northern Arizona, US. Set below Dutton Point on the Powell Plateau, and overlooking the Shinumo Amphitheater, it is situated three miles west of Holy Grail Temple, 2.7 miles northwest of Dox Castle, and 1.6 miles north-northeast of Fan Island. According to the Köppen climate classification system, Masonic Temple is located in a cold semi-arid climate zone, with precipitation runoff draining south to the Colorado River via Hakatai Canyon from the west aspect, Burro Canyon from the south aspect, and Muav Canyon from the east aspect. This butte is an erosional remnant composed of strata of the Pennsylvanian-Permian Supai Group overlaying the conspicuous cliffs of Mississippian Redwall Limestone, in turn overlaying the Cambrian Tonto Group.

Etymolgy
Masonic Temple was named by George Wharton James as a tribute to the Order of Freemasons, an organization to which he belonged. To James, the immense angular walls below Dutton Point seemed to form a square, and the freemasonry expression "on the square" suggested to him the name. This feature's name was officially adopted in 1908 by the U.S. Board on Geographic Names.

Gallery

See also
 Geology of the Grand Canyon area

References

External links 

 Weather forecast: National Weather Service
 Masonic Temple photo by Harvey Butchart

Grand Canyon
Landforms of Coconino County, Arizona
Colorado Plateau
Grand Canyon National Park
Buttes of Arizona
North American 1000 m summits
Sandstone formations of the United States
Grand Canyon, North Rim
Grand Canyon, North Rim (west)